Pasquale del Pezzo, Duke of Caianello and Marquis of Campodisola (2 May 1859 – 20 June 1936), was an Italian mathematician.

He was born in Berlin (where his father was a representative of the Neapolitan king) on 2 May 1859. He died in Naples on 20 June 1936. His wife was the Swedish writer Anne Charlotte Leffler, sister of the great mathematician Gösta Mittag-Leffler (1846–1927).

At the University of Naples, he received first a law degree in 1880 and then in 1882 a math degree. He became a pre-eminent professor at that university, teaching projective geometry, and remained at that University, as rector, faculty president, etc.

He was mayor of Naples from 1914 to 1917. Starting in 1919 he became a Senator of the Kingdom of Italy until his death.

He is remembered particularly for first describing what became known as a del Pezzo surface.

References

G. Gallucci, Rend. R. Acc. delle Scienze Fisiche e Mat. di Napoli, 8, 1938, 162–167.

External links
Biography PRISTEM – Bocconi University
Bibliography (University of Palermo)
Familytree

1859 births
1936 deaths
19th-century Italian mathematicians
Members of the Senate of the Kingdom of Italy
Algebraic geometers
Italian algebraic geometers